Crackle is an on-demand internet streaming media provider currently owned by Chicken Soup for the Soul Entertainment, that distributes a number of Crackle-exclusive programs, including original series like Chosen. Sony Pictures Television was the co-owner of Crackle until 2020.

Original programming

Drama

Comedy

Unscripted

Docu-series

Reality

Variety

Original films

Feature films

Documentaries

Upcoming original programming

Ordered

Exclusive international distribution
These shows were acquired by Crackle from another country to air exclusively in the US.

References

External links

Crackle
Crackle
Crackle Programming